

286001–286100 

|-bgcolor=#f2f2f2
| colspan=4 align=center | 
|}

286101–286200 

|-id=162
| 286162 Tatarka ||  || Dominik Tatarka (1913–1989), a Slovak writer, essayist, screenwriter and translator of French authors into Slovak || 
|}

286201–286300 

|-bgcolor=#f2f2f2
| colspan=4 align=center | 
|}

286301–286400 

|-bgcolor=#f2f2f2
| colspan=4 align=center | 
|}

286401–286500 

|-bgcolor=#f2f2f2
| colspan=4 align=center | 
|}

286501–286600 

|-bgcolor=#f2f2f2
| colspan=4 align=center | 
|}

286601–286700 

|-id=693
| 286693 Kodaitis ||  ||  (1879–1957), German-born Lithuanian astronomer, professor at Kaunas and Vilnius universities, who founded the astronomical observatory in Kaunas in Lithuania || 
|}

286701–286800 

|-bgcolor=#f2f2f2
| colspan=4 align=center | 
|}

286801–286900 

|-id=841
| 286841 Annemieke ||  || Sara Annemieke Meyer (born 1976), a biologist and the wife of German discoverer Maik Meyer || 
|-id=842
| 286842 Joris ||  || Joris Benjamin Meyer (born 2003) is the son of German discoverer Maik Meyer || 
|}

286901–287000 

|-bgcolor=#f2f2f2
| colspan=4 align=center | 
|}

References 

286001-287000